Avet Barseghyan is an Armenian songwriter and TV host, who hosted the Junior Eurovision Song Contest 2011 in Yerevan, Armenia, alongside Gohar Gasparyan.

Barseghyan has also written several of Armenia's entries for both the Eurovision Song Contest and the Junior Eurovision Song Contest, as well as being the country's commentator since . He hosted the third season of the Armenian edition of The X Factor.

Filmography

Television

Film

Discography
Barseghyan is credited as a songwriter of the following songs:

Notes and references

Notes

References

External links
 

Living people
1980 births
Television people from Yerevan
Armenian television presenters